This is a list of lighthouses in the Bahamas.

Abaco Islands

Acklins

Andros Island

Berry Islands

Bimini

Cay Sal Bank

Crooked Island

Eleuthera

Exuma Sound

Grand Bahama

Inagua

Jumentos Cays

Mayaguana

New Providence

See also 
 Transport in the Bahamas
 Lighthouse
 Lists of lighthouses

References

External links 

 Amateur Radio Lighthouse Society list of lighthouses in the Bahamas
 Lighthouses of the Bahamas
 Bahamian lighthouses in history
 

Bahamas
 
Bahamas transport-related lists
Lighthouses